Matthew Vincent LaPorta (born January 8, 1985) is an American former professional baseball first baseman and left fielder who played for the Cleveland Indians of Major League Baseball (MLB) from 2009 to 2012. LaPorta played college baseball for the University of Florida.

Early years 
LaPorta was born in Port Charlotte, Florida.  He attended Charlotte High School after transferring from Port Charlotte High School. He played fullback on his freshman football team for the PCHS Pirates.

College career 
LaPorta was originally drafted by the Chicago Cubs in the 14th round of the 2003 MLB Draft, but instead accepted an athletic scholarship to attend the University of Florida in Gainesville, Florida, where he played for coach Pat McMahon's Florida Gators baseball team from 2004 to 2007. In 2004, he played collegiate summer baseball in the Cape Cod Baseball League for the Yarmouth-Dennis Red Sox, returned to the league in 2006 to play for the Brewster Whitecaps, and was named a league all-star both seasons.

He led NCAA Division I baseball with 26 home runs, which garnered LaPorta All-American honors as he helped lead the team to the 2005 College World Series final. In , his batting average dipped from .328 to .259. In June, LaPorta was drafted in the fourteenth round of the 2006 Major League Baseball Draft by the Boston Red Sox, but he chose to stay at Florida for his senior year; during that season, he earned his second All-American selection. LaPorta batted .402 with twenty home runs his senior season with the Gators.  Also, LaPorta was recognized as the SEC Player of the Year.  He graduated from Florida with a bachelor's degree in health and human performance in 2009.

Professional career

2007 draft 
LaPorta was drafted by the Milwaukee Brewers with the seventh overall pick of the 2007 MLB Draft. The Milwaukee Brewers agreed on June 25 to a contract with LaPorta, giving him a signing bonus of approximately $2 million.

2007 season 
After rehabilitating his leg, LaPorta was sent to the Brewers Rookie League Affiliate, the Helena Brewers. In his first at-bat as a professional player, LaPorta hit a home run. He played 7 games with Helena in left field and as the designated hitter. Then in August, he was moved up to the Brewers Single-A affiliate, the West Virginia Power. Laporta had success playing Single-A ball, hitting 10 home runs in 23 games during the regular season. Like in Helena, he played mostly left field and designated hitter. The Power went on to make the South Atlantic League playoffs and advanced to the finale, but lost to the Columbus Catfish in a best of 5 series. LaPorta was selected by the Brewers to represent them in the Arizona Fall League. He played with the Mesa Solar Sox for 30 games, and hit 6 home runs during that time, which was tied for the most in the league.

2008 season 

In January, the Brewers announced that LaPorta would be invited to spring training. On the opening day game for the Huntsville Stars, LaPorta hit a grand slam. By May, some wondered whether LaPorta might be the next Ryan Braun.  Through June 13, LaPorta was leading the Southern League in home runs with 20 and was batting .288 with 66 RBI.

On July 7, 2008, LaPorta was traded to the Cleveland Indians organization along with three other Brewers minor league players in exchange for left-handed starting pitcher CC Sabathia.  Upon his arrival in Akron, Cleveland's Double-A affiliate, he switched from right to left field. He made his first appearance with the club on July 9. LaPorta was selected to play in the Futures Game on July 13 for Team USA. On July 16, LaPorta was one of 24 players selected to represent the United States in the 2008 Beijing Olympics.

Before the Olympics, Team USA competed in exhibition games against Canada. LaPorta had three home runs and five RBIs in the four games against Canada. USA began play in the Olympics on August 13 against Korea.

In a game against China on August 18, LaPorta suffered a mild concussion after he was struck in the head by a pitch by Chinese relief pitcher Chen Kun at the start of the seventh inning. The  beaning followed a controversial play in the sixth inning when American outfielder Nate Schierholtz made a hard slide home against backup catcher Yang Yang on a sacrifice fly. Yang was in the game after China's starting catcher Wang Wei left the game after suffering a left knee injury following a collision at the plate with LaPorta in the fifth inning.  After being struck by the pitch, LaPorta was taken to a hospital for a precautionary CAT scan; Chen Kun and China's pitching coach Steven Ontiveros were ejected from the game.  The United States went on to win the game 9-1. In the Bronze-Medal match against Japan, LaPorta had a solo home run as Team USA won the Bronze Medal.

2009 season 
LaPorta attended spring training with the Indians; he was sent to AAA Columbus Clippers on March 24, 2009. LaPorta batted .333 with five homers, four doubles, two triples, 14 RBIs and a 1.054 OPS in 21 games with the Clippers, and was called up to the Indians on May 2. On May 3, LaPorta struck out in his first Major League at bat against the Detroit Tigers.  On May 4, LaPorta hit his first major league home run and his first major league hit off of Toronto's Brian Tallet.

2010 season 
Going into spring training for the 2010 season, LaPorta was expected to transition to the role of starting first baseman. However, when the Indians signed Russell Branyan and announced he would be the everyday first baseman, LaPorta instead became a contender for the left field position, along with Michael Brantley. Branyan's back problems limited him to no game action during spring training, causing him to begin the season on the 15-day disabled list. Consequently, LaPorta was moved back to the first baseman position. After Branyan was activated from the disabled list on April 20, LaPorta was moved primarily to the backup first baseman role, with some playing time in left field. In order for him to receive more at-bats and continue his development, LaPorta was optioned to Triple-A Columbus on June 7.  On June 27 the Indians traded Branyan to the Seattle Mariners for  outfielder Ezequiel Carrera and shortstop Juan Diaz,  LaPorta was recalled from Triple-A Columbus to be the everyday first baseman for the Indians.

2012 season
According to Baseball Reference, LaPorta split the 2012 season between the Indians (22 games) and the Columbus Clippers (101 games). On November 20, 2012, LaPorta was assigned outright to the Indians Triple-A affiliate Columbus Clippers.

2014 season
LaPorta signed a minor league deal with the Baltimore Orioles for the 2014 season.

On April 12, 2015 LaPorta announced his retirement.

Awards and achievements 
 2005 and 2007 SEC Player of the Year
 Two time Southern League Player of the Week in 2008
 2008 USA Olympic Team
 2008 Futures Game selection

See also 

 2005 College Baseball All-America Team
 2007 College Baseball All-America Team
 Florida Gators
 List of Florida Gators baseball players
 List of Olympic medalists in baseball
 List of University of Florida alumni
 List of University of Florida Olympians

References

External links

1985 births
Living people
Akron Aeros players
All-American college baseball players
American expatriate baseball players in Mexico
American people of Italian descent
Arizona League Indians players
Baseball players from Florida
Baseball players at the 2008 Summer Olympics
Brewster Whitecaps players
Charlotte High School (Punta Gorda, Florida) alumni
Cleveland Indians players
Columbus Clippers players
Florida Gators baseball players
Helena Brewers players
Huntsville Stars players
Leones del Caracas players
American expatriate baseball players in Venezuela
Major League Baseball first basemen
Major League Baseball left fielders
Medalists at the 2008 Summer Olympics
Mesa Solar Sox players
Mexican League baseball first basemen
Olympic bronze medalists for the United States in baseball
People from Port Charlotte, Florida
Piratas de Campeche players
Port Charlotte High School alumni
West Virginia Power players
Yarmouth–Dennis Red Sox players